Add Violence is the sixth extended play (EP) and eleventh major release by American industrial rock band Nine Inch Nails. Released through The Null Corporation and Capitol Records on July 19, 2017, it is the second in a trilogy of releases, following the EP Not the Actual Events (2016) and preceding the band's ninth studio album Bad Witch (2018). It was produced by Trent Reznor and Atticus Ross.

Moving away from the more aggressive nature of Not the Actual Events, the EP focused more on soundscapes and textures alongside their traditional elements, similar to that of The Fragile (1999), which resulted in more longform compositions. The release was promoted with two singles: "Less Than" and "This Isn't the Place", along with their accompanying music videos. Add Violence received a positive response from critics, and reached No. 17 on the U.S. charts.

Themes and composition
In an interview with Zane Lowe, Reznor said:

Critical reception

Critical reception for the EP was generally positive. At Metacritic, which assigns a rating out of 100 to reviews from mainstream critics, the EP received an average score of 77, based on 11 reviews, indicating "generally favorable reviews". Gavin Miller from Drowned in Sound gave the EP a score of 8 out of 10, writing that "it's a little light on substance, but what we do get is a really fascinating insight into where Reznor is at with NIN at the moment". Kory Grow of Rolling Stone also gave the EP a positive review, saying that it "contains all the aggression, abjection and self-loathing that solidified Reznor's position as alt-rock's Original Angster but with the measured restraint of a man his age".

Track listing
All tracks written by Trent Reznor and Atticus Ross.

Personnel
Credits adapted from liner notes.

Nine Inch Nails
 Trent Reznor – songwriting, arranging, production, programming, performance
 Atticus Ross – songwriting, arranging, production, programming, performance

Additional musicians
 Sharlotte Gibson – additional vocals ("Less Than")
 Allison Iraheta – additional vocals ("Less Than")

Technical
 42 Entertainment – world integration and execution
 Tom Baker – mastering
 John Crawford – art direction
 Corey Holms – additional design
 Chris Holmes – engineering
 Church Lieu – additional concept development
 Dustin Mosley – engineering
 Alan Moulder – mixing
 Jun Murakawa – engineering
 Geoff Neal - engineering
 Chris Richardson – engineering

Charts

Release history

References

2017 EPs
Albums produced by Trent Reznor
Albums produced by Atticus Ross
Nine Inch Nails EPs
The Null Corporation EPs